is a railway station on the San'yō Shinkansen and the Seishin-Yamate Line serving the city of Kobe, Japan, and the surrounding area. It is located to the north of Kobe city centre, at the foot of Mount Rokkō. The Shinkansen trains mostly run inside tunnels under the mountains in this area. The station exists in a small space in between two long tunnels (Rokkō and Kobe Tunnels).

This station was newly built for the San'yō Shinkansen and is connected with the city center by the Kobe Municipal Subway.

Lines 
JR West (San'yō Shinkansen)
Kobe Municipal Subway (Seishin-Yamate Line and Hokushin Line, station number: S02)

Layout

San'yō Shinkansen
Two side platforms serving two tracks. Both platforms have platform screen doors.

Seishin-Yamate Line and Hokushin Line

One side platform serving one track and one island platform serving two tracks (one of which is single ended).

History 
The shinkansen station opened on 15 March 1972. The subway station opened on 18 June 1985. With the privatization of Japanese National Railways (JNR) on 1 April 1987, the station came under the control of JR West. The Hokushin Line started operation on 2 April 1988.

On 17 January 1995, the station was affected by the Great Hanshin earthquake, with all services halted. Operations resumed on the Hokushin Line from 18 January, subway services resumed from 16 February, and Sanyo Shinkansen services resumed from 8 April 1995.

From the start of the revised timetable introduced on 1 October 2003, Shin-Kobe Station became a mandatory stopping point for all high-speed Shinkansen trains.

Surrounding area 
 Shin-Kobe Oriental City
 Shin-Kobe Ropeway
 Nunobiki Falls
 Nunobiki Herb Garden
 Maya Cablecar and Maya Ropeway
 Mt. Maya

See also
 List of railway stations in Japan

References

External links  

JR West station information 

Railway stations in Kobe
Railway stations in Japan opened in 1972
Sanyō Shinkansen
Stations of Kobe Municipal Subway